Nepenthes chaniana (after Datuk Chan Chew Lun, Managing Director of Natural History Publications) is a tropical pitcher plant species belonging to the genus Nepenthes.  It is characterised by a dense indumentum of long, white hairs. Pitchers are cylindrical and mostly white to yellow in colouration. Nepenthes chaniana belongs to the loosely defined "N. maxima complex", which also includes, among other species, N. boschiana, N. epiphytica, N. eymae, N. faizaliana, N. fusca, N. klossii, N. maxima, N. platychila, N. stenophylla, and N. vogelii.

Cultivated plants of this species were for a long time misidentified as N. pilosa. While N. pilosa is endemic to Kalimantan, N. chaniana is native to Sabah and Sarawak (Bukit Batu Lawi and other mountains). The pitchers of N. pilosa are rounder and broader in shape than those of N. chaniana.

The type specimen of N. chaniana was collected by Charles Clarke on Mount Alab, the highest peak in Crocker Range National Park.

Natural hybrids
? N. albomarginata × N. chaniana
 N. chaniana × N. veitchii

Plants identified by Charles Clarke as a hybrid between N. chaniana (known as N. pilosa at the time) and N. lowii are now thought to represent N. fusca × N. lowii.

References

Further reading

 Adam, J.H., C.C. Wilcock & M.D. Swaine 1992. The ecology and distribution of Bornean Nepenthes. Journal of Tropical Forest Science 5(1): 13–25.
 Bourke, G. 2010. The climbing pitcher plants of the Kelabit highlands. Captive Exotics Newsletter 1(1): 4–7. 
 Fretwell, S. 2013. Back in Borneo to see giant Nepenthes. Part 3: Mt. Trusmadi and Mt. Alab. Victorian Carnivorous Plant Society Inc. 109: 6–15.
 Kurup, R., A.J. Johnson, S. Sankar, A.A. Hussain, C.S. Kumar & S. Baby 2013. Fluorescent prey traps in carnivorous plants. Plant Biology 15(3): 611–615. 
 Lee, C.C. 2000. Recent Nepenthes Discoveries. [video] The 3rd Conference of the International Carnivorous Plant Society, San Francisco, USA.
 McPherson, S.R. & A. Robinson 2012. Field Guide to the Pitcher Plants of Borneo. Redfern Natural History Productions, Poole.
 Thorogood, C. 2010. The Malaysian Nepenthes: Evolutionary and Taxonomic Perspectives. Nova Science Publishers, New York.
 New pitcher plant species that went unnoticed. Daily Express October 28, 2006.

 Meimberg, H., A. Wistuba, P. Dittrich & G. Heubl 2001. Molecular phylogeny of Nepenthaceae based on cladistic analysis of plastid trnK intron sequence data. Plant Biology 3(2): 164–175. 
  Meimberg, H. 2002. Molekular-systematische Untersuchungen an den Familien Nepenthaceae und Ancistrocladaceae sowie verwandter Taxa aus der Unterklasse Caryophyllidae s. l.. Ph.D. thesis, Ludwig Maximilian University of Munich, Munich. 
 Meimberg, H. & G. Heubl 2006. Introduction of a nuclear marker for phylogenetic analysis of Nepenthaceae. Plant Biology 8(6): 831–840. 
 Meimberg, H., S. Thalhammer, A. Brachmann & G. Heubl 2006. Comparative analysis of a translocated copy of the trnK intron in carnivorous family Nepenthaceae. Molecular Phylogenetics and Evolution 39(2): 478–490. 
 Mey, F.S. 2014. Joined lecture on carnivorous plants of Borneo with Stewart McPherson. Strange Fruits: A Garden's Chronicle, February 21, 2014.

External links

Photographs of N. chaniana at the Carnivorous Plant Photofinder

Carnivorous plants of Asia
chaniana
Plants described in 2006